Jean-Paul Villain (born 1 November 1946) is a retired French runner. In 1971 he won the steeplechase at the European Championships and Mediterranean Games. He competed in this event at the 1968, 1972 and in 1976 Summer Olympics with the best result of ninth place in 1968.

References

1946 births
Living people
French male steeplechase runners
French male middle-distance runners
Olympic athletes of France
Athletes (track and field) at the 1968 Summer Olympics
Athletes (track and field) at the 1972 Summer Olympics
Athletes (track and field) at the 1976 Summer Olympics
European Athletics Championships medalists
Mediterranean Games gold medalists for France
Athletes (track and field) at the 1971 Mediterranean Games
Mediterranean Games medalists in athletics
20th-century French people
21st-century French people